The Terrenceville Formation is a formation cropping out in Newfoundland. These Formations are included in the 1995 publication of Geology of the Appalachian—Caledonian Orogen in Canada and Greenland which was edited by Harold Williams.

References
2. "Geology of the Appalachian—Caledonian Orogen in Canada and Greenland"- edited by Harold Williams

Geology of Newfoundland and Labrador